Mazori Hatti Mullo (Yaghnobi Мазори Ҳатти Мулло) is a mazar in the Yaghnob Valley in Tajikistan. It is located near to the village Sokan.

References
 Тағоймурод Ёрзода: Yaγdnovi folklor. Фолклори Яғноб (Маҷмӯаи илмӣ-оммавӣ). Душанбе (Империал-Групп) 2007.

Yaghnob